Michelbeuern-AKH  is a station on  of the Vienna U-Bahn. It is located in the Alsergrund District and is the station that serves the Vienna General Hospital (AKH). It opened in 1989.

References

External links 
 

Buildings and structures in Alsergrund
Railway stations opened in 1989
Vienna U-Bahn stations